Queensland Country Life is a newspaper published in Queensland, Australia, since 1935. It focuses on rural news.

History
The Queensland Country Life newspaper is the second of that name. The first newspaper was published from 1900 to 1910 and is unrelated to the current newspaper.

The Queensland Country Life newspaper was first published on 25 July 1935. In its first issue, it described itself as a subsidiary of a New South Wales newspaper Country Life and that it incorporated the Grazier's Review and was the official organ of the:
 United Graziers' Association of Queensland
 Brisbane Wool Selling Brokers' Association
 Brisbane Fat Stock and Produce Brokers' Association

The newspaper is published once a week.

Digitisation 
The paper has been digitised as part of the Australian Newspapers Digitisation Program  of the National Library of Australia.

See also
 List of newspapers in Australia

References

External links
 
 

Newspapers published in Queensland
1935 establishments in Australia
Newspapers on Trove
Weekly newspapers published in Australia